Ganpatipule (Mar : गणपतीपुळे) is a costal town in  Ratnagiri district of Maharashtra. Due to its Ganpati mandir the town is popular Hindu pilgrimage and tourists destination. 

The town is situated near Ratnagiri city which is seat of its namesake district, Chiplun town is located its north side.

Etymology
According to local folklore, the Hindu god Ganpati, taking umbrage at a remark made by a native lady, moved to Pulé पुळे from his original abode of Gulé. Thus the region was named Ganpati-pulé.

The 400-year-old Ganpati idol at Ganpatipule is said to have sprung up from the soil.

Ganpatipudhe mandir 

Ganpatipule town is situated approximately 375 km. south of Mumbai city, along the Konkan Coast. It is situated in a small town which have about 100 houses. The beach present near the town is a popular tourist destination. 

The Ganpatipudhe temple has Swayambhu murti. Every year thousands of devotees across Maharashtra visit the temple. The murti is facing West, Ganapatipule town is rich in flora, it have plenty of mangroves and coconut trees.

The town is governed by the Ganapatipule Grampanchayat.

Climate

After March, the temperature starts rising but rarely crosses 30 °C. May is the hottest month, with temperatures reaching 40 °C. The monsoon lasts from June to October, when rains are usually plentiful and regular.

Demographics

Marathi is the most widely spoken language. Hindi and English are understood and spoken by many. There are Marathi medium schools run by Ganpatiphule Grampanchayat / Ratnagiri. The nearest college is at Malgund. There are many villages in Ganapatipule which are full of greenery. The main occupation of the villagers is agriculture and service business . Rice and coconut are the most common crops in this area.
Many festivals are celebrated along the Konkan Coast. Among the most significant are Gauri Ganpati and Magh Chaturthi (the fourth day of the lunar month of Magh).

Tourism
With the development of tourism, a number of resorts and hotels have opened in this small town, the most significant of which is the Maharashtra Tourism Development Corporation resort near the beach. Other resorts and spas include Greenleaf Resort, Abhishek Beach Resort and Spa, Areopagus Spa, and The Blue Ocean Resort and Spa, Hotel Heramb in Ganpatipule and also a few smaller hotels also Bhakt Nivas available for tourist in this town.

Nearby places
The village of Velneshwar, situated north of the Shastri River, has its own peaceful, coconut-fringed beach, where one can relax in tranquility. The village comes alive each year during the Maha Shivaratri fair, when pilgrims in large numbers visit the Old Shiva Temple. According to folklore, a fisherman had found a statue in his net which he had promptly thrown back into the sea. He again found the statue back in his net. Angered by this he banged the statue on a stone, but the statue started bleeding. The fisherman picked up the statue and place it in a small temple which then grew into the Velneshwar Shiva Temple.

About 26 km from Ganapatipule lies the district headquarters town of Ratnagiri. This region has a long illustrious past and is even mentioned in Indian mythology.

Malgund, a small village 1 km away from Ganpatipule, is known as the birthplace of the Marathi poet Keshavasuta, born in 1866. He is regarded as a poet who heralded the dawn of modern Marathi poetry. There is a monument at Malgund dedicated to his work and also a museum where one can find information on most of the modern-day poets of the Marathi language.

Resting on a cliff, at the entrance of the Sangameshwar river, just 20 km from Ganapatipule, is Jaigad Fort. This 16th-century fort offers a view of the sea and of Konkan village life. A 15 km back road connects Ganpatipule to Jaigad via Malgund.

Besides its natural environment, Pawas is well known for the Ashram of Swami Swaroopanand, a spiritual leader who influenced an entire generation of Maharashtrians. The distance from Ratnagiri to Pawas is approximately 20 km.
There are extensive views from the lighthouse, around 6–7 km from Jaigad Fort. It was completed in 1932 and is still completely operational and serving on the coast. Around 13.7 km north on route to Jaigad Fort from Ganpatipule Ganesh temple is the newly built Jai Vinayak temple. The temple has pagoda-style architecture. The temple was built in 2003 by JSW group when they launched their thermal power project at Jaigarh.

Transportation

The town has a small bus stand, State transport buses to Kolhapur Pune are available town is easily accessible from the port city of Ratnagiri, which also has a railway station and an airport.

Road
Ganapatipule is 32 km from Nivali, a small village on Mumbai Goa Road (NH 17). From Nivali, one has to turn right for Ganapatipule. The distance from Nivali to Ratnagiri is around 20 km. The distance from Nivali to Hatkhamba is around 4 km. From Hatkhamba one has to take a right turn for Ratnagiri, which is 16 km from here. Sangameshwar is about 25 km from Nivali and 45 km from Chiplun. From Ganapatipule one can approach Ratnagiri directly without coming to Nivali and going through Hatkhamba. The direct road has many more turns and is narrow compared to NH-17. That distance is around 30 km. Mumbai is 375 km away via Mahad, and Pune is 331 km away via Satara. For fast journeys, Ganapatipule is also connected with other cities by state transport buses. Buses are available from major cities like Mumbai, Pune, Sangli, Kolhapur and Solapur to Ratnagiri. From Ratnagiri, private cabs also ply to the town.

Bus
There are frequent buses from the MSRTC Bus Station (Ratnagiri) to Ganapatipule via Ratnagiri Railway Station, Nevade Road and MSRTC Bus Station (Ratnagiri) to Ganapatipule via Ratnagiri Railway Station, Nevade Road, Malgund.
One can reach Ganapatipule faster by taking the MSRTC City Bus from Ratnagiri Railway Station to MSRTC Bus Station (Ratnagiri) and then changing buses there to a bus to Ganapatipule via Arevare. There are MSRTC buses from Mumbai, Pimpri-Chinchawad, Pune, Swarget (Pune), Miraj, Chiplun, Deorukh Sawantwadi (only seasonal), and Panjim (only seasonal).

Private buses ply between Mumbai / Pune to Ganpatipule via Ratnagiri. Neeta Travels : Borivali (Mumbai) to Ganpatipule via Ratnagiri.
Purple Travels (MTDC) : Borivali (Mumbai) to Ganpatipule via Ratnagiri.

Train
There is no railway station at Ganapatipule. The nearest railway stations are at Ratnagiri and Bhoke. All the express, passenger trains stop at Ratnagiri, being a city. Bhoke is a small village and only Dadar passenger trains will stop there.

References

 About Ganpatipule

External links

Ganpatipule Temple
Konkan Darshan with pictures
Maharashtra Tourism Department website
Maharashtra Tourism Development Corp - Resort Ganapatipule
Ratnagiri District website
 How to reach Ganpatipule
 Visiting Ganpatipule Temple 

Beaches of Maharashtra
Cities and towns in Ratnagiri district
Ganesha temples
Tourist attractions in Ratnagiri district